Helen McMurchie Bott (1886–?) was a Canadian author on child development. Bott held degrees from the University of Toronto (Bachelor's, 1912; Master's, 1923). Her 1933 and 1934 books were the first and second ones published in the Child Development Series of the University of Toronto. She married the psychologist, Edward Alexander Bott (1887–1974), and they had three daughters, among them anthropologist Elizabeth Bott. Bott served as the head of parental education at the Institute of Child Study until 1938.

Partial works
  Personality Development in Young Children
  Method in Social Studies of Young Children
  Adult Attitudes to Children's Misdemeanours

References

1886 births
Canadian women non-fiction writers
Year of death missing
20th-century Canadian non-fiction writers
20th-century Canadian women writers
Canadian educational theorists